Adrian Carnegie Slade  (born 25 May 1936), is a British Liberal Democrat politician and advertising agency founder.

He was educated at Trinity College, Cambridge, where he became President of the Footlights, and famously recruited Peter Cook to the society.

He was a Liberal Party parliamentary candidate in the 1960s and 1970s,
contesting Putney in 1966, February 1974 and October 1974. He stood as an SDP–Liberal Alliance candidate in Wimbledon in 1987.
He scored an upset win in the 1981 elections to the Greater London Council (GLC), winning the Richmond seat from the Conservatives by just 115 votes. He became Leader of the SDP–Liberal Alliance group on the GLC, and remained so until the GLC's dissolution in 1986.

He served as the last President of the Liberal Party, from 1987 to 1988, conducting its merger negotiations with the SDP.  He was vice-president of the Liberal Democrats 1988–89.

He is also known within Liberal Party circles as a pianist and singer, talents which he shared with his brother Julian Slade. There is a third brother, Sir Christopher Slade (Lord Justice of Appeal, 1982–91) and a sister.

He has two children, Nicola and Rupert, with his wife Sue.

References 

1936 births
Living people
Commanders of the Order of the British Empire
Members of the Greater London Council
Liberal Democrats (UK) politicians
Presidents of the Liberal Party (UK)
Alumni of Trinity College, Cambridge